Fight is the fifth  live album by San Francisco-based punk rock band Flipper, released May 19, 2009 by MVD Audio. The album was recorded in 2007; the first four tracks were recorded at Funhouse in Seattle, Washington, and the next five at Dante's in Portland, Oregon.

Track listing

Tracks 3, 4, 5, 7 appear on the studio album Love. Tracks 1, 2 appear on the album Album – Generic Flipper. Tracks 8, 9 appear on the album Gone Fishin'. Track 6 from the "Love Canal" 7" single.

Personnel
Flipper
 Bruce Loose – lead vocals
 Ted Falconi – guitar
 Krist Novoselic – bass guitar, backing vocals
 Steve DePace – drums

Production
 Jack Endino – recording, mixing
 Gary Hobish – mastering
 Nicholas Evans - live sound engineer (Funhouse 2006 - 2010)

References

Flipper (band) albums
2009 live albums
Albums produced by Jack Endino